Catch, playing catch, or having a catch, is one of the most basic children's games, often played between children or between a parent and child, wherein the participants throw a ball, beanbag, flying disc or similar object back and forth to each other. At early stages in a child's life, having a catch is a good way to evaluate and improve the child's physical coordination. Notably, "[i]f a child cannot catch a ball that he or she is bouncing, it is unlikely the child will be able to play catch". Most children begin to be able to play catch around the age of four. Many four-year-olds instinctively close their eyes when a ball is heading towards them, and it can take some time to overcome this. Playing catch can help develop dexterity, coordination and confidence.

Because playing catch requires at least two participants, and because participants can be substituted at any point during the game, catch can be used to place children in social situations where they will interact with each other. For example, this can be done by first having one child play catch with an adult, and then bringing other children into the game or substituting another child for the adult, at which point the adult can leave entirely. As children become more adept at the skills used to catch a thrown object and return it to the thrower, these skills are incorporated into more complex games played with larger groups of participants, such as hot potato, dodgeball, and keep away. Playing catch can improve an aptitude for sports that involve catching and throwing, such as bat-and-ball sports, football, and basketball.

See also
Catch (juggling)
Fetch (game)
Flying disc freestyle (Frisbee)
Keep away

References

Children's games
Games of physical skill